Bucculatrix ceibae is a moth in the family Bucculatricidae. It is found in Bolivia. It was first described by Philipp Christoph Zeller in 1871.

The larvae feed on Ceiba species.

References

Natural History Museum Lepidoptera generic names catalog

Bucculatricidae
Moths of South America
Taxa named by Philipp Christoph Zeller